Higginsville may refer to the following places:
Higginsville, Missouri
Higginsville, Nova Scotia
Higginsville, West Virginia
Higginsville, Western Australia
Higginsville Gold Mine, a gold mine near Higginsville, Western Australia